The 2014 FIA WTCC Race of France (formally the FIA WTCC JVC Kenwood Race of France) was the second round of the 2014 World Touring Car Championship season and the sixth running of the FIA WTCC Race of France. It was held on 20 April 2014 at the Circuit Paul Ricard in Le Castellet, France.

Both races were won by Citroën Total WTCC, reigning champion Yvan Muller won race one and José María López won race two.

Background
After the opening round of the season, José María López was leading the drivers' championship by one point over of teammate Sébastien Loeb. Franz Engstler was leading the Yokohama Trophy for drivers in TC2 specification cars.

After a crash in race two caused significant damage to his car, Tom Coronel missed the French round while his Chevrolet RML Cruze TC1 was repaired. Mehdi Bennani came into the weekend with a three–place grid penalty for race one having been deemed to have caused the collision.

Report

Testing and free practice
López led a Citroën 1–2 in Friday testing, he headed Loeb and the Zengő Motorsport Honda of Norbert Michelisz.

Loeb headed Campos Racing's Hugo Valente in free practice one on Saturday. The session was interrupted when Yvan Muller collided with a tyre stack and damaged his Citroën C-Elysée WTCC.

Valente was quickest in the second practice session with Tom Chilton in second making it a Chevrolet 1–2.

Qualifying
Muller was quickest in the first part of qualifying while the Lukoil Lada Sport drivers all missed out, as Mikhail Kozlovskiy suffered a steering arm issue, James Thompson stopped on the circuit and Robert Huff narrowly missed out on a Q2 place to Tiago Monteiro.

Muller set the pace once again in the second part of qualifying ahead of his Citroën team mates. Gabriele Tarquini in fifth put a Honda through to Q3 for the first time this season.

In the Q3 shoot–out it was Loeb who came out on top to claim his first WTCC pole position with López and Muller second and third. Tarquini was fourth ahead of the Chevrolet of Valente.

Loeb and López were later excluded from qualifying due to an error with their automatic fuel cut-off systems. They would start at the back for both races with Muller gaining pole position for race one and Mehdi Bennani promoted to pole for race two.

Race One
The race began on a damp track, Muller got a slow start and was passed by Tarquini and Michelisz before the first corner. Muller regained the lead on lap three while Valente was under pressure from Huff who had put himself up to fifth place with a good start. By lap three Loeb had worked his way up to sixth place and the Frenchman made the move at the start of lap four. Loeb then took fourth from Valente and Huff followed him through to demote Valente again. Loeb had eventually fought his way up to third behind Tarquini while López was delayed by the Lada of Huff who he finally cleared on lap seven. On lap ten Michelisz came together with López, sending the Citroën sideways although neither car sustained damage and they continued in fourth and fifth. After a number of laps fighting over second place, Tarquini made a mistake over one of the kerbs and this allowed Loeb to close in and pass the Honda. Further back Valente tried a pass up the inside of Huff although the Chevrolet lost grip and had a near-miss with Huff and Michelisz. Shortly after Huff and Valente moved up to fifth and sixth at the expense of Michelisz. Muller claimed his first win of the season with Loeb second and Tarquini on degrading tyres third. Engstler finished 16th and was the Yokohama Trophy winner.

Race Two
Monteiro leapt ahead of Bennani at the start, Morbidelli was spun around further back in the pack by Chilton. At the end of lap two Muller and Loeb collided as Muller tried to go up the inside of his teammate. On lap five Tarquini passed Bennani to move up to second behind Monteiro who had put a gap between himself and the rest of the field. Both López and Muller then moved up ahead of Bennani in their pursuit of the factory Hondas. On lap seven Tarquini made a mistake at the chicane which allowed López and Muller through. At this point Loeb took out one of the tyre stacks while attempting a pass on Dušan Borković and the debris on the track led to the safety car being brought out. The race was restarted on lap 10, Monteiro defended from López immediately as the Citroën tried to go around the outside at the first corner. This opened the door for Muller to try to pass López for second place. At the back of the field John Filippi collided with Engstler which brought out the safety car for a second time, Chilton meanwhile was issued with a drive–through penalty for causing the collision with Morbidelli on the opening lap. The race resumed on lap 12, Loeb tried to pass Borković at the first corner and the pair came together with Loeb being pushed into a half spin. On lap 14 López passed Monteiro to take the lead, Muller followed through and took part of Monteiro's front bumper off as he went through. On lap 17 Valente drifted wide allowing Huff to have a look, the pair touched with Valente going wide and Morbidelli behind saw an opportunity to pass and move himself up to ninth place. Loeb had passed Borković after a number of laps and was now looking to catch Bennani, he had a lunge at the first corner. At the front López led Muller home at the checkered flag with Monteiro taking the final podium spot. Engstler took the Yokohama Trophy victory once again.

Results

Qualifying

Bold denotes Pole position for second race.

 — Loeb and López were excluded from qualifying after their automatic fuel cut-off systems were found not to be working during scrutineering.

Race 1

Bold denotes Fastest lap.

Race 2

Bold denotes Fastest lap.

Standings after the event

Drivers' Championship standings

Yokohama Trophy standings

Manufacturers' Championship standings

 Note: Only the top five positions are included for both sets of drivers' standings.

References

External links
World Touring Car Championship official website

France
FIA WTCC Race of France